Swindon is a village and civil parish located in the West Midlands. The nearest major town is Dudley, approximately five miles eastwards. It stands halfway between the small town of Kingswinford and village of Wombourne.

Historically, Swindon was part of Seisdon rural district, but in 1974 was incorporated into the new local authority of South Staffordshire.

It has a few local shops including a convenience store, two churches and a pub (The Old Bush Inn).  Until recently there was another pub, The Greyhound, but this has since been converted into homes. 

Having at one time seen a gradually reduced bus service through the village, in recent years a more frequent service has run.  The village is served by National Express West Midlands service 16 between Wolverhampton and Stourbridge. This service runs every 30 minutes Monday to Saturday daytime and hourly on Sundays and Bank Holidays including late night journeys.

Schools
St John's CofE Primary School

Churches
Ebeneezer United Reformed Church
St John's Church of England Church

Shops and Pubs
The Green Man
The Old Bush 
Swindon Convenience Store and Post Office

Note that the Convenience store operated under the Londis fascia until 2020.

History
Swindon was formerly part of the parish of Wombourne, but was administratively distinct.  A manor belonged to Englefield family, the lords of Englefield, Berkshire, as part of the manor of Himley.  This manor was demised to John de Somery, Baron Somery the tenant in chief ub c.1316 and by 1346 passed to his nephew John de Sutton II, who had succeeded to the barony of Dudley.  The manor then descended as part of the family estates in the area at least until William Humble Eric Ward, 3rd Earl of Dudley sold his local estates in 1947.

Chasepool is mentioned in Domesday Book as part of the property of William Fitz-Ansculf, lord of Dudley, but was waste on account of the forest.   It was one of the hays (enclosed areas for hunting) of Kinver Forest.  The area passed into the hands of the lords of Dudley in the 15th century, initially as lesses of the herbage and pannage.  It was granted to Edward Sutton, 4th Baron Dudley when the family property was restored to him in 1555 and devolved as part of the family estates until 1947 in the same was as Swindon.  By 1600 there was a lodge (Chasepool Lodge), leased to Edward Green, who probably gave his name to the adjacent Greensforge.  his son also Edward gave a lease for lives of it to his son Dud Dudley.

Iron Works 
Swin or Swindon Forge was once a fulling mill then a corn mill belonging to Halesowen Abbey.  This was converted into a finery forge, perhaps in the 1620s.   This was leased to Thomas Foley in 1647 and passed to his son Philip with many of his other ironworks in 1669.  After he sold it in 1674, it passed through various hands, coming into the hands of Francis Homfray of Oldswinford by the 1720s, remaining in the hands of this family until 1820.  The works were much enlarged in the 19th century, so that in 1859 there were 13 puddling furnaces.  It was leased in 1866 to E. P. and W. Baldwin, the owners of the Wilden Ironworks.  Their successor company amalgamated to form Richard Thomas & Baldwin Ltd, which became part of the nationalised British Steel Corporation, who closed the works in 1976.  During World War II  many of the village males who worked there were given reserved occupation status as the works was considered vital to the war effort. The works  were demolished in the early 1980s to make way for new housing, the developments were named Swin Forge Way and Baldwin Way, Baldwin coming from the name of the works. All that remains today is the canteen which is now used as the village community centre.

The former forge at Greensforge is also within the present parish.

See also
Listed buildings in Swindon, Staffordshire

References

External links
Swindon Cricket Club
Swindon Golf Club
Swindon Crown Green Bowling Club

External links

Villages in Staffordshire
Civil parishes in Staffordshire